The 2006 Autobacs Super GT Series was the fourteenth season of the Japan Automobile Federation Super GT Championship including the All Japan Grand Touring Car Championship (JGTC) era and the second season as the Super GT series. It was also the twenty-fourth season of a JAF-sanctioned sports car racing championship dating back to the All Japan Sports Prototype Championship. The season began on March 19 and ended on November 5, 2006 after 9 races.

Juichi Wakisaka, André Lotterer, and Toyota Team TOM's won the GT500 drivers' and teams' championships, in the debut season for the new Lexus SC430. Tetsuya Yamano, Hiroyuki Iiri, and RE Amemiya Racing won the GT300 drivers' and teams' championships in their Mazda RX-7. The championship battle was decided on the final lap of the season, with Yamano and Iiri winning the drivers' title on a tiebreaker over Kazuho Takahashi and Hiroki Katoh of Cars Tokai Dream28.

Drivers and teams

GT500

GT300

Vehicle changes

GT500 

 Toyota introduced the Lexus SC430 as their new GT500 vehicle, replacing the fourth-generation Toyota Supra. This coincided with the introduction of the Lexus nameplate for the Japanese market in July 2005. Four teams (TOM's, Cerumo, LeMans, and Kraft) would run the new SC430, while SARD and Tsuchiya Engineering continued to use the Supra.
 Team Goh planned to enter the series with a Maserati MC12 GT1 driven by Seiji Ara and Jan Magnussen. Competing as Stile Corse, they participated in the pre-season test at Suzuka on 3-4 March, but after lacklustre results, the team scrapped their plans to race in GT500.

GT300 

 Mooncraft Engineering and Cars Tokai Dream28 introduced the Shiden MC/RT-16, a prototype racing car based upon the Riley Mk.XI Daytona Prototype powered by a Toyota 1UZ-FE V8 engine.

Team changes

GT500 

 Kondo Racing, owned by Japanese musician and former racing driver Masahiko Kondo, entered Super GT for the first time as a Nissan factory team.
 Toyota teams TOM's and Kraft scaled back to single-car teams after running two cars each in 2005.
 Hitotsuyama Racing and their privately-entered Ferrari 550 GTS and McLaren F1 GTR withdrew from the series.

GT300 

 M-TEC (Mugen) closed their GT300 team to focus on their ongoing technical alliance with Team Kunimitsu in GT500.
 Autobacs Racing Team Aguri (ARTA) closed their GT300 team. apr, who operated ARTA's GT300 programme, signed ARTA drivers Morio Nitta and Shinichi Takagi to drive their number 101 Toyota MR-S sponsored by Toy Story Racing (through Run'A Entertainment).

Driver changes

GT500 

 Tsugio Matsuda transferred from Honda to Nissan, where he joined two-time GT500 champion Satoshi Motoyama in the number 23 NISMO entry. Likewise, Sakon Yamamoto transferred from Toyota to Nissan to partner another two-time GT500 champion, Michael Krumm, in the NISMO number 22 car.
 Masataka Yanagida and two-time GT500 champion Érik Comas joined the new Kondo Racing team. Yanagida transferred from NISMO, and Comas transferred from Hasemi Motorsport.
 Naoki Yokomizo transferred from Toyota to Nissan and joined Hasemi Motorsport, who also signed reigning All-Japan Formula 3 champion João Paulo de Oliveira for his Super GT series debut.
 Kazuki Hoshino, son of Impul co-founder Kazuyoshi Hoshino, stepped up to GT500 to join Team Impul. Hoshino replaced Yuji Ide, who signed with Super Aguri F1 Team.
 Nakajima Racing and Honda signed two recent Formula 3 graduates to drive for them in 2006: Formula 3 Euroseries graduate Loïc Duval, and All-Japan F3 race winner Hideki Mutoh.
 2005 GT300 championship runner-up Shinya Hosokawa was promoted to GT500 with Team Kunimitsu, partnering Sébastien Philippe.
 André Lotterer transferred from Honda to Toyota, and joined Toyota Team TOM's in their number 36 car. His new team mate was 2002 champion Juichi Wakisaka, who transferred from Toyota Team LeMans.
 In exchange for Wakisaka, Tatsuya Kataoka transferred from TOM's shuttered number 37 team to join Toyota Team LeMans, alongside 2002 co-champion Akira Iida.
 Takeshi Tsuchiya joined his father's team, Toyota Team Tsuchiya, after transferring from TOM's.
 Katsuyuki Hiranaka was promoted to GT500 with Toyota Team SARD, joining André Couto.

Schedule

Season results

Overall winner in bold

Standings

GT500 Drivers
Scoring system

Only the best five results in the first six races would be counted for the championship.
There were no points awarded for pole position and fastest lap in the final race.

Teams

GT300 Class (Top 3)

Drivers

Teams

External links

 Super GT official race archive 

Super GT seasons
Super GT